In 1933, the U.S. state of Virginia renumbered almost all of its state highways. This renumbering was caused by the assignment of numbers from 600 up to the new secondary system, but all three-digit numbers were affected. At the same time, all numbers that conflicted with U.S. Routes - except State Route 13 - were renumbered, and all long overlaps with U.S. Routes were eliminated. Several new routes had the same numbers as U.S. Routes and served as their extensions.

List of routes
Prior to 1933, routes were assigned by district. Two-digit routes generally crossed district lines, while three-digit routes were assigned with their first digit as the district number. The new system also grouped routes by district, but not as strictly (these routes could cross lines) and with no room for expansion; thus additional routes, starting later in 1933, often received numbers from 283 up.

Note: a number of routes were added in 1932, and their pre-1933 numbers are not given in the meeting minutes. These routes are marked as "unknown".

Two-digit routes, 2-57, and U.S. Route extensions

District 1, 59-98

District 2, 99-124

District 3, 125-135 and 150-152

District 4, 136-149 and 153-163

District 5, 164-196

District 6, 198-229

District 7, 230-248

District 8, 249-282

References
CTB Meeting Archives
Virginia Highways Project

 Renumbering 1933
Virginia State Highway Renumbering, 1933
State Highway Renumbering
History of Virginia
Highway renumbering in the United States
 Renumbering 1933